Michael Devlin may refer to:

Michael Devlin (bass-baritone) (born 1942), opera singer
Michael J. Devlin (born 1965), convicted kidnapper and child molester
Mike Devlin (entrepreneur), co-founder of Rational Software
Mike Devlin (American football) (born 1969), ex-Buffalo Bills guard
Michael Devlin (footballer) (born 1993), Scottish professional footballer